Oruch may refer to:
Aruj, a Barbary pirate
Oruch, Iran, a village in East Azerbaijan Province, Iran